LeeAnne Locken (born June 7, 1967) is an American actress, philanthropist, television personality, model, and author. She first rose to prominence after winning the Miss Arizona pageant in 1989, and gained further notability for her regular appearances in the reality television series Big Rich Texas and The Real Housewives of Dallas.

Locken began her career as an actress, appearing in films such as Vasectomy: A Delicate Matter (1986) and My Best Friend Is a Vampire (1987). She subsequently competed in the Miss Texas USA beauty pageant in 1988, winning second runner-up; and went on to win the Miss Arizona USA contest the following year, placing in the top ten at the Miss USA 1989 pageant. She continued to star in other films and television shows including Sons of Thunder (1999), Miss Congeniality (2000), Walker, Texas Ranger (2001) and Beyond the Farthest Star (2015).

In 2009, Locken made her reality television debut, starring in She's Got the Look, to which she placed third in the show's second season. She was introduced as a board member and representative for the charity The Fashionistas, in Esquire Network's series Big Rich Texas in 2012. She left the show after two seasons in 2013. From 2016 until 2020, she served as a main cast member in Bravo's The Real Housewives of Dallas since the series premiere, leaving the show after its fourth season. Locken has published multiple books and shown her continuous involvement in her philanthropic activities for several charities.

Early life and education 
Locken was born on June 7, 1967, to Perry Joseph Wade and Margaret Gayle Hicks in Pasadena, Texas and raised by her grandparents from the age of three years old in Houston, Texas. She was introduced to the carnival world at a young age and began her first job as a carnival worker when she was just a child. She graduated from J. Frank Dobie High School in 1985 and attended The University of Houston.

Career

Film and television

Acting 
Locken has had roles in television programs including: Sons of Thunder, Walker, Texas Ranger, Inspector Mom, Chase, GCB and Ex-Housewife. She has also appeared on the covers of Gladys, People, Restyled and OTS Magazine. Additionally, Locken has appeared in several films: Vasectomy: A Delicate Matter (1986), My Best Friend Is a Vampire (1987), The Only Thrill (1997), Broken Vessels (1999), Miss Congeniality (2000), Rain (2006), Chariot (2013), Pros and Cons: A Fantasy Football Movie (2013), Beyond the Farthest Star (2015) and Carter High (2015).

Reality television 
In 2009, Locken joined the season two cast of TV Land's She's Got the Look. She made a guest appearance in Most Eligible Dallas for its first season in 2011. In 2012, Locken was added to the cast of Big Rich Texas for its second season in a recurring capacity as a representative for the charity The Fashionistas, along with the charity's founder, Heidi Dillon. Both left after the show's third season in 2013.

It was announced on November 15, 2015, that Bravo was expanding The Real Housewives franchise to Dallas, Texas; with Locken joining the cast of The Real Housewives of Dallas, alongside Cary Deuber, Tiffany Hendra, Stephanie Hollman and Brandi Redmond. The first season premiered on April 11, 2016. After four years on the show, Locken announced her departure from the series on February 25, 2020, ahead of the show's fifth season. The show was later put on an indefinite hiatus after five seasons. She has also made numerous appearances on Watch What Happens Live! with Andy Cohen throughout her time as a housewife.

Modeling and pageants 
Locken began modeling at the age of 19 and subsequently entered the Miss Texas USA beauty pageant in 1988, placing third. At age 22, Locken won Miss Arizona USA 1989 and went on to compete in the Miss USA 1989 pageant, placing in the top 10. Locken continued her modeling career into the 1990s and early 2000s, and shot campaigns alongside fellow model Hendra.

Philanthropy 
Locken has been a pivotal part of The Fashionistas, DIFFA: Design Industries Foundation Fighting AIDS, Fashion Group International, AIDS Services of Dallas, Dallas Challenge and Housing Crisis Center charities; hosting galas, raising money and increasing awareness for each of the charity's causes. As of current, she serves as the vice president of The Fashionistas and is a board member of Housing Crisis Center. She has previously been the honorary chair for AIDS Services of Dallas' "No Tie Dinner" gala and co-chair of Dallas Challenge's "Art From the Heart" event. She has also made numerous speeches at women's empowerment exhibitions, sharing her own experiences with domestic violence.

Authoring 
On November 5, 2012, Locken published a book titled What's Your Status?: Finding Your Way to a More Positive Life One Day at a Time!, which is described as "a collection of daily posts designed to motivate, inspire and encourage others to be their best and live a more positive life one post at a time". On August 1, 2018, Locken released Color Me Crazy: Adult Coloring Book, with the front cover resembling her confessional interview moment from the second season of The Real Housewives of Dallas where she and her dog wore matching hotdog costumes. The book was featured on the show's third season.

Personal life 
Locken began working in the carnival scene at three years old and left once she was able to buy rides at the carnival at the age of sixteen. As a self-described "carny kid", she was exposed to environments involving domestic abuse and drugs at a young age. She has been very vocal regarding her struggle with mental health problems including depression and low self-esteem. She has also discussed her suicidal past, revealing she now advocates for people who have dealt with similar situations as herself.

In April 2019, Locken married law enforcement veteran Rich Emberlin, which was featured on The Real Housewives of Dallas for its fourth season.

Filmography

Film

Television

See also 
 The Real Housewives
 The Real Housewives of Dallas

References

External links

1967 births
Living people
People from Dallas
20th-century American people
American actresses
Actresses from Dallas
Actresses from Houston
American film actresses
American television actresses
American television personalities
American writers
American models
American philanthropists
Participants in American reality television series
The Real Housewives of Dallas
The Real Housewives cast members